Little Tybee Island is located south of Tybee Island, Georgia, USA. The size is 6,780 total acres including marsh. It is home to a number of endangered species of birds. The yachting events of the 1996 Summer Olympics were held off the island's coast in Wassaw Sound.

References

External links
 Explore Tybee: Little Tybee Island
 Tybee Island Activities Little Tybee

Protected areas of Chatham County, Georgia
Barrier islands of Georgia (U.S. state)
Nature reserves in Georgia (U.S. state)
Georgia (U.S. state) Sea Islands
Islands of Chatham County, Georgia